Natalie Shaw (born June 14, 1980) is an American actress from Topanga Canyon, California currently living in Venice, California. She played the character Shane Fusco on the television series Under Suspicion, earning her a nomination for Best Performance by a Young Actress in a Drama Series for the Young Artist Awards, Tally in Just One Night with Timothy Hutton, Rachel Kaplan on the House MD episode "Babies & Bathwater", and more. She was also in a Roman Coppola-directed Levis commercial. She is the daughter of actress Susan Damante and the younger sister of actress Vinessa Shaw.

Early life
Natalie Shaw graduated from Sarah Lawrence College.

Filmography

References

External links 
 

1980 births
Living people
American television actresses
21st-century American women